Lutzhorn is a small municipality, part of the district of Pinneberg, in Schleswig-Holstein, northern Germany. Three SubCommunities: Im Dorf, Krummendiek and Seis belong to Lutzhorn. Lutzhorn is part of the Amt Rantzau.

Geography
Lutzhorn is located about 4 km north of Barmstedt. Hollenbek, Störbek and Krumm-Bach flow through this community. Parts of the state forest Rantzau belong to Lutzhorn.

History
1255 first mentioned

References

External links
Community Lutzhorn

Pinneberg (district)